Kuznetsky (masculine), Kuznetskaya (feminine), or Kuznetskoye (neuter) is the name of several rural localities in Russia:
Kuznetsky, Kudeyarovsky Selsoviet, Lukoyanovsky District, Nizhny Novgorod Oblast, a settlement in Kudeyarovsky Selsoviet of Lukoyanovsky District of Nizhny Novgorod Oblast
Kuznetsky, imeni Stepana Razina Work Settlement, Lukoyanovsky District, Nizhny Novgorod Oblast, a settlement under the administrative jurisdiction of the work settlement of imeni Stepana Razina, Lukoyanovsky District, Nizhny Novgorod Oblast
Kuznetsky, Novosibirsk Oblast, a settlement in Chulymsky District of Novosibirsk Oblast
Kuznetskoye, Chelyabinsk Oblast, a selo in Kuznetsky Selsoviet of Argayashsky District of Chelyabinsk Oblast
Kuznetskoye, Kaliningrad Oblast, a settlement in Pereslavsky Rural Okrug of Zelenogradsky District of Kaliningrad Oblast
Kuznetskoye, Tver Oblast, a village in Sandovsky District of Tver Oblast